Bourdelle is a surname of French origin. People with that name include:

 Antoine Bourdelle (born Émile Antoine Bordelles, 1861-1929), French sculptor, painter, and teacher
 List of works by Antoine Bourdelle
 Musée Bourdelle, Paris
 Thomy Bourdelle (1891-1972), French actor

See also
 Bourdelles, a commune in the Gironde department in Nouvelle-Aquitaine in southwestern France
 Pierre de Bourdeille, seigneur de Brantôme (1540-1614), French historian, soldier, and biographer

Surnames of French origin